Disibodenberg is a monastery ruin in Rhineland-Palatinate, Germany. It was founded by Saint Disibod. Hildegard of Bingen, who wrote Disibod's biography "Vita Sancti Disibodi", lived in Disibodenberg for 39 years.

In 640, Disibod came as a missionary from Ireland to Francia. After working for 10 years in Vosges and Ardennes, he arrived near Odernheim am Glan and started teaching there. After his death, the monastery was founded. The Normans and the Hungarians plundered and destroyed the site several times, but Archbishop Willigis of Mainz rebuilt the church and monastery in the 10th century. It was home to famed saint Hildegard Von Bingen throughout much of the 12th century.

Notes 
 Wolfgang Müller: Nahekunde: Sobernheim und seine Umgebung im Wechsel der Zeiten. Sobernheim a. d. Nahe: H. Schäffling, 1924.
 Charlotte Kerner: Alle Schönheit des Himmels - Die Lebensgeschichte der Hildegard von Bingen. 1993
 Eberhard J. Nikitsch: Kloster Disibodenberg. Religiosität, Kunst und Kultur im mittleren Naheland. (Große Kunstführer Bd. 202). Regensburg 1998.

External links 

 Scivias-Stiftung Disibodenberg

Monasteries in Rhineland-Palatinate
Ruins in Germany
Naheland